Yunyarinyi is an Aboriginal homeland on the Aṉangu Pitjantjatjara Yankunytjatjara Lands in South Australia.

Yunyarinyi started as a cattle station called Kenmore Park. It officially became an Indigenous community when the land rights were granted in 1981 by the Anangu Pitjantjatjara Yankunytjatjara Land Rights Act 1981.

Location and population
The population fluctuates around 50 people, with many children among them. Residents travel to use the shop and services at Pukatja.

Facilities
Kenmore Park Anangu School caters for children from birth to Year 12.

There is a community centre with a shared kitchen, a community office, a local garage (repair shop), and community garden patch.

References

External links

Aboriginal communities in South Australia
Towns in South Australia
Anangu Pitjantjatjara Yankunytjatjara